Jacquet or Jaquet is a French name which in the Middle Age designated pilgrims on the Way of St. James (Saint-Jacques in French)

Jacquet

Given name
Jacquet of Mantua (1483–1559), French composer
Jacquet de Berchem (1505–1567), Franco-Flemish composer

Surname
Aimé Jacquet (born 1941), French footballer and coach
Al Jacquet, American politician
Alain Jacquet (born 1939), French artist
Claire Jacquet (born 1988), French canoeist
Earthna Jacquet, American tennis player
Ernest Jacquet (1886–1969), Swiss ice hockey player
Fernand Jacquet (1888–1947), Belgian pilot
Gaston Jacquet (1883–1970), French actor
Henri Jacquet (1888–??), Swiss fencer
Hervé Jacquet (born 1939), French-American mathematician
H. Maurice Jacquet (1886–1954), French composer
Ib Jacquet (born 1956), Danish footballer
Illinois Jacquet (1922–2004), American jazz saxophonist
Jeffrey Jacquet (born 1966), American actor
Jennifer Jacquet, American professor
John Blockley Jacquet (1868–1942), English-born Australian Geological Surveyor and Chief Inspector of Mines
Jonathan Jacquet (born 1984), Argentine footballer
Justo Jacquet (born 1961), Paraguayan footballer
Kyrian Jacquet (born 2001), French tennis player
Lloyd Jacquet (1899–1970), American publisher
Loïc Jacquet (born 1985), French rugby union footballer
Luc Jacquet (born 1967), French film director
Lucien Jacquet (1860–1914), French dermatologist
Mardi Jacquet (born 1960), French-American model
Michael Jacquet (born 1997), American football player
Miguel Jacquet (born 1995), Paraguayan footballer
Nate Jacquet (born 1975), American football player
Olivier Jacquet (born 1969), Swiss fencer
Pierre Armand Jacquet (1906–1967), French metallurgist and chemist
Quentin Jacquet (born 1991), French motorcycle racer
Robert Jacquet (1906–1970), French rower
René-Jean Jacquet (1933–1993), French footballer
Russell Jacquet (1917–1990), American trumpeter

Jaquet

Surname
Christophe Jaquet (born 1976), Swiss footballer
Frank Jaquet (1885–1958), American actor
Gérard Jaquet (1916–2013), French politician
Gilles Jaquet (born 1974), Swiss snowboarder
Joseph Jaquet (1822–1898), Belgian sculptor
Sabrina Jaquet (born 1987), Swiss badminton player
Sandrine Jaquet (born 1971), Swiss tennis player
Wendy Jaquet (born 1943), American politician

Jacquette

Given name
Jacquette Ada (born 1991), Cameroonian footballer
Jacquette Guillaume (1665–??), French writer
Jacquette Löwenhielm (1797–1839), Swedish noble

Surname
Dale Jacquette (1953–2016), American philosopher
Julia Jacquette (born 1964), American artist
Tommy Jacquette (1943–2009), American community activist
Yvonne Jacquette (born 1934), American painter and printmaker

Other
Jacquet (game), a board game related to Backgammon

French masculine given names
French-language surnames